Ludwig Georges Francillette (born 1 May 1999) is a Guadeloupean professional footballer who plays as a defender for  club Crawley Town.

Club career

Newcastle United
Born in Basse-Terre, Guadeloupe, Francillette played youth football for Dijon FCO until he was released in 2018, and signed for sixth-tier side AS Quetigny, initially as a reserve team player before establishing himself in their first team. He was scouted by Newcastle United of the Premier League and signed for their under-23 side in summer 2019. He was released by the club in at the end of the 2020–21 season.

Crawley Town
On 5 August 2021, it was announced that Francillette had signed for EFL League Two side Crawley Town on a two-year contract following periods on trial at both Crawley and Portsmouth. He made his debut for the club on 10 August 2021 in a 2–2 EFL Cup draw with Gillingham and was the only player to miss a penalty in a 10–9 shoot-out defeat. He made his league debut a week later in the club's 2–1 win over Salford City. He scored his first senior goal in Crawley's 2–1 win at Newport County on 15 April 2022 with a low strike following a "slick corner routine". Francillette made 29 appearances during the 2021–22 season.

International career
Francillette has represented Guadeloupe at youth international level.

Career statistics

References

External links

1999 births
Living people
People from Basse-Terre
Guadeloupean footballers
French footballers
French people of Guadeloupean descent
Dijon FCO players
Newcastle United F.C. players
Crawley Town F.C. players
English Football League players
Association football defenders
French expatriate footballers
French expatriate sportspeople in England
Expatriate footballers in England